The Center for Retrospective Digitization in Göttingen is an online system for archiving academic journals maintained by the University of Göttingen.

See also 
JSTOR
 List of retrodigitized Mathematics Journals and Monographs

References

External links
Official website (German only)

German digital libraries
Academic publishing
Göttingen